Senator Burch may refer to:

Benjamin Franklin Burch (1825–1893), Oregon State Senate
I. L. Burch (1856–1939), South Dakota State Senate
John Chilton Burch (1826–1885), California State Senate
John Christopher Burch (1827–1881), Tennessee State Senate
Rob Burch (politician) (born 1946), Ohio State Senate
Thomas G. Burch (1869–1951), U.S. Senator from Virginia in 1946

See also
James Harvey Birch (1804–1878), Missouri State Senate